Park Avenue (Welsh: Coedlen y Parc) currently called Aberystwyth University Stadium for sponsorship purposes, is a football stadium in Aberystwyth, Wales and has served as the home of Cymru Premier side Aberystwyth Town since 1907.

The stadium capacity is 5,000 with 1,500 seats. It is a 4G artificial turf pitch.
In May 2021, the ground was designated UEFA Category 2 status after successful inspection by Standards Officer Scott Struthers. 
The ground is adjacent to the River Rheidol and close to the shore of Cardigan Bay. The ground has a bar, named after John Charles, who played in the Wales national football team.

Layout
The ground has five areas:  the Railway End, named after the former Carmarthen to Aberystwyth Line; the Dias Stand after a former Green Legend; the Rhun Owens Stand after a former secretary; the Shed End and the Narks Corner.

History
The ground has hosted the final of the Welsh League Cup on eleven occasions. The club renamed the hospitality room the 'Lolfa Emyr James' (Emyr James Suite) after a board member who died in August 2018.

George Best played for the Northern Ireland Youth Team here four days before his seventeenth birthday on 18 May 1963.

Aberystwyth Town F.C.
Football venues in Wales
Welsh Cup final venues
Stadiums in Wales
Buildings and structures in Aberystwyth